Hogarth may refer to:

People 
 Burne Hogarth (1911–1996), American cartoonist, illustrator, educator and author
 David George Hogarth (1862–1927), English archaeologist
 Donald Hogarth (1879–1950), Canadian politician and mining financier
 Joseph Hogarth (1801–1879), British fine art print publisher and retailer
 Mary Hogarth, sister-in-law of Charles Dickens
 Paul Hogarth (1917–2001), English painter and illustrator
 Steve Hogarth (born 1959), English musician; lead singer of the rock band Marillion
 Susan Hogarth, American libertarian politician
 Thomas William Hogarth (1901–1999), writer of books about the Bull Terrier breed of dog
 William Hogarth (1697–1764), English painter, engraver, pictorial satirist and cartoonist
 Engraving Copyright Act 1734, or "Hogarth('s) Act"
 John Collier (caricaturist) (1708–1786), artist, poet and satirical writer known as the "Lancashire Hogarth"
 William Hogarth Main, known as Bill Main, namesake of the Hogarthian system of dive equipment configuration

Fictional characters
 Hogarth Hughes, main child character in the film The Iron Giant voiced by Eli Marienthal
Peter Hogarth, the protagonist of Stanislaw Lem's His Master's Voice

Organizations 
 Hogarth Press, English publisher
 Hogarth Worldwide

English-language surnames